Fiona is  a genus of sea slugs, specifically aeolid nudibranchs, marine gastropod molluscs in the family Fionidae.
Fiona is the type genus of the family Fionidae.

Species 
Species within the genus Fiona include:
 Fiona pinnata (Eschscholtz, 1831)

A study published in 2016 showed that Fiona pinnata is a species complex of at least three species.

Ecology 
Species of Fiona feed on goose barnacles and live on floating objects in the oceans worldwide.

References

Fionidae